"U Already Know" is a R&B song recorded by American R&B band 112 for their fifth studio album  Pleasure & Pain (2005).

Slim and Q share lead vocals, with Daron providing ad libs at the end.

Track listing 
"U Already Know" (Radio Edit) — 3:16
"U Already Know" (Instrumental) — 3:16
"U Already Know" (Call Out) — 1:16
Official Remixes
"U Already Know" (Murder Remix featuring Ja Rule & Harry O)
"U Already Know" (Roc-A-Fella Remix featuring Foxy Brown)

Charts

Weekly charts

Year-end charts

References 

"Already know"- David Williams

2004 singles
112 (band) songs
Foxy Brown (rapper) songs
Bad Boy Records singles
Songs written by Lil' Eddie
Songs written by Sean Garrett
2004 songs
Hip hop soul songs